Thollapalli is a small hamlet in Karnataka (near Pathapalya), Chikkaballapur district, India  located at the longitude of 77.9477728 and the latitude of 13.788571. Surrounding villages are Agatamadaka & Gummanayakana Palya.

Banks Nearby:
Canara Bank (Bagepalli),
Statebank of mysore (Bagepalli),
Kotak Mahindra Bank(Pathapalya)

Educational Institutions Nearby:
 National College Bagepalli
 Govt-Junior College Bagepalli

Notable places
Gummanayakana Kote 
History of Polegars 
Agatamadakkamma Temple built by Late Venkata Shiva Reddy
Sree rama temple
Sai Temple

http://wikimapia.org/24759215/Sethu-Lakshminarasimha-Swamy-Temple-Lake

Villages in Chikkaballapur district